Pascal René Malbeaux (16 July 1961 – 8 June 2012) was a French professional footballer who played as a defensive midfielder. In his career, he played for INF Vichy, Rouen, Bordeaux, Alès, Le Havre, Valenciennes, and AS Strasbourg. He made 104 appearances and scored three goals in the Division 1.

Post-playing career 
Malbeaux retired from football in 1994. He would go on to become the manager of Strasbourg Koenigshoffen before becoming the club's president.

On 8 June 2012, Malbeaux died due to cancer.

Honours 
INF Vichy

 Coupe Gambardella: 1979–80

Rouen

 Division 2: 1981–82 Group B

Bordeaux

 Coupe de France: 1985–86

Valenciennes

 Division 2: 1991–92 Group A

References 

1961 births
Living people
Footballers from Brittany
Sportspeople from Brest, France

French footballers
Association football midfielders
INF Vichy players
FC Rouen players
FC Girondins de Bordeaux players
Olympique Alès players
Le Havre AC players
Valenciennes FC players
AS Strasbourg players
French Division 3 (1971–1993) players
Ligue 2 players
Ligue 1 players
Division d'Honneur players
French football managers
FCO Strasbourg Koenigshoffen 06 managers
French football chairmen and investors
Deaths from cancer in France